Thornton McDade (born 28 October 1980) is a South African field hockey player who competed in the 2008 Summer Olympics. and the 2012 Summer Olympics.

His current club is Old Edwardians, Johannesburg.

His preferred shirt number is "18"

References

External links

1980 births
Place of birth missing (living people)
Living people
South African people of Scottish descent
South African male field hockey players
Olympic field hockey players of South Africa
Field hockey players at the 2008 Summer Olympics
Field hockey players at the 2012 Summer Olympics
Havant Hockey Club players
2006 Men's Hockey World Cup players
2010 Men's Hockey World Cup players